Plasmepsin I (aspartic hemoglobinase I, PFAPG, malaria aspartic hemoglobinase) is an enzyme. This enzyme catalyses the following chemical reaction

 Hydrolysis of the -Phe33-Leu- bond in the alpha-chain of hemoglobin, leading to denaturation of the molecule

This enzyme is present in the malaria organism, Plasmodium.

References

External links 
 

EC 3.4.23